Fahad Abdulrahman Abdullah (born 10 October 1962) is a UAE football (soccer) player who played as a midfielder for the UAE national football team and Al Wasl FC Club in Dubai.

References

1962 births
Living people
1990 FIFA World Cup players
Al-Wasl F.C. players
United Arab Emirates international footballers
Emirati footballers
Place of birth missing (living people)
UAE Pro League players
Association football midfielders